Hamsun is a 1996 internationally co-produced drama film directed by Jan Troell, about the later life of the Norwegian author Knut Hamsun (Max von Sydow), who, together with his wife Marie Hamsun (Ghita Nørby), went from being a national hero to a traitor after supporting Nazi Germany during their occupation of Norway during World War II.

Sydow and Nørby speak in their native Swedish and Danish respectively, though there is a scene where he speaks English and several where she speaks German; the rest of the cast speak Norwegian or German.

The film won the Guldbagge Awards for Best Film, Best Actor (Sydow), Best Actress (Nørby) and Best Screenplay (Enquist). The film was selected as the Danish entry for the Best Foreign Language Film at the 69th Academy Awards, but was not shortlisted as a nominee.

Cast
 Max von Sydow as Knut Hamsun
 Ghita Nørby as Marie Hamsun
 Anette Hoff as Ellinor Hamsun
 Gard B. Eidsvold as Arild Hamsun
 Eindride Eidsvold as Tore Hamsun
 Åsa Söderling as Cecilia Hamsun
 Sverre Anker Ousdal as Vidkun Quisling
 Liv Steen as Maria Quisling
 Erik Hivju as Dr. Gabriel Langfeldt
 Edgar Selge as Josef Terboven
 Ernst Jacobi as Adolf Hitler
 Svein Erik Brodal as Egil Holmboe
 Per Jansen as Harald Grieg
 Jesper Christensen as Otto Dietrich
 Johannes Joner as Finn Christensen
 Finn Schau - Ørnulv Ødegård

Production
The plans for the film have a history from 1979, when Thorkild Hansen, the author of the book Processen mod Hamsun contacted Troell since he wanting him to direct a Norwegian television series based on the book. Max von Sydow was meant to do the part as Hamsun already then, but NRK dropped out on the project in the belief that it would be too controversial.

Fourteen years later, in 1993, von Sydow brought the project back to life when he got the Danish production company Nordisk Film interested in adapting the book, this time with Per Olov Enquist, who had written Troell's previous film Il Capitano, providing the screenplay.

The shooting took place during the spring and the summer of 1995, with a budget of around 40 million SEK. Noteworthy is that the most expensive scene filmed in which Marie Hamsun witnesses the attack and the sinking of the German cruiser Blücher in the Oslofjord at the Battle of Drøbak Sound on 9 April 1940, was cut from the finished product.

Release
The film was initially meant to be released in the autumn 1996 at the Venice Film Festival, but was brought forward to the spring as Norwegian television would release another film about Hamsun the same year. It also saved the film from having to compete against Bille August's historical epic Jerusalem.

During the Swedish release Troell and the producer heavily criticized the distributor, Svensk Filmindustri, for the sloppy handling of the film, something he had also experienced with his previous film Il Capitano.

See also
 Notable film portrayals of Nobel laureates
 List of submissions to the 69th Academy Awards for Best Foreign Language Film
 List of Danish submissions for the Academy Award for Best Foreign Language Film

References

External links
 
 

1996 films
1996 drama films
Swedish drama films
Norwegian drama films
1990s Norwegian-language films
1990s Swedish-language films
1990s Danish-language films
Films set in Norway
Films directed by Jan Troell
Best Film Guldbagge Award winners
Knut Hamsun
Films about Nobel laureates
Danish World War II films
Biographical films about writers
1996 multilingual films
Danish multilingual films
Danish drama films
German drama films
Swedish World War II films
Norwegian World War II films
German World War II films
1990s German films
1990s Swedish films